Ibson Barreto da Silva (born 7 November 1983), simply known as Ibson, is a Brazilian footballer who plays as a central midfielder for Nacional de Muriaé.

Club career

Flamengo
Born in São Gonçalo, Rio de Janeiro, Ibson arrived at Clube de Regatas do Flamengo in 1992, at the age of nine. He was promoted to the first team in the 2003 season and made his debut in a match against CR Vasco da Gama, totalling nine appearances in the Série A that year; his father, Laís Souza, eventually became a scout at the club.

In the following campaign, Ibson became one of the team's most important players: under the guidance of Abel Braga and playing alongside the likes of Felipe, Jean and Zinho, he won the Taça Guanabara and the Campeonato Carioca, and also finished as runner-up in the Copa do Brasil; that season, he scored six goals from 44 appearances.

Subsequently, some European clubs showed interest in Ibson and, in January 2005, just three games into the regional championship, he was transferred to FC Porto. Flamengo received many criticism about his transfer, most of it coming from the transfer values – around US$2,5 million. At the time, club directors said they cashed the money as his contract would run out at the end of the year, so they could have lost him for nothing.

Porto / Flamengo return
Ibson had a good start with Porto, quickly becoming a habitual first-choice. In his first complete season he won the Primeira Liga and the Taça de Portugal, appearing in 21 games all competitions combined (one goal) and adding the following year's Supertaça Cândido de Oliveira.

In 2006–07, however, Ibson lost his importance in the squad, also having some problems with manager Jesualdo Ferreira. He would return to Flamengo subsequently, being loaned in July 2007. He arrived with the side placed in relegation zone (18th), signing alongside Maxi Biancucchi and Fábio Luciano and helping to an incredible comeback as they finished third, the best performance since the title-winning season in 1992, which also secured a place in the 2008 edition of the Copa Libertadores; he scored six times in 22 matches and was also elected the league's best right midfielder, and the loan was then extended for a further year.

Journeyman
On 13 July 2009, Ibson was released by Porto and signed a three-year contract with FC Spartak Moscow, being sold for €4 million. He netted twice in 28 matches in the 2010 season, helping to a fourth place in the Russian Premier League.

Ibson represented five teams from 2011 to 2015, including former side Flamengo. On 23 February 2015, he joined Minnesota United FC from the North American Soccer League.

At the end of the 2018 season, 35-year-old Ibson was released by the TCF Bank Stadium-based club.

Tombense
At the end of May 2019, Ibson was announced as a new player of Tombense.

Club statistics

according to FlaEstatística
Notes

Honours

Club
Flamengo
Campeonato Brasileiro Série A: 2009
Taça Guanabara: 2004, 2008
Taça Rio: 2009
Campeonato Carioca: 2004, 2008, 2009

Porto
Primeira Liga: 2005–06, 2006–07
Taça de Portugal: 2005–06
Supertaça Cândido de Oliveira: 2006

Santos
Campeonato Paulista: 2012

Corinthians
Recopa Sudamericana: 2013

Individual
Campeonato Brasileiro Série A Team of the Year: 2007

References

External links

1983 births
People from São Gonçalo, Rio de Janeiro
Sportspeople from Rio de Janeiro (state)
Living people
Brazilian footballers
Association football midfielders
CR Flamengo footballers
FC Porto players
FC Spartak Moscow players
Santos FC players
Sport Club Corinthians Paulista players
Bologna F.C. 1909 players
Sport Club do Recife players
Minnesota United FC (2010–2016) players
Minnesota United FC players
Tombense Futebol Clube players
Amazonas Futebol Clube players
Campeonato Brasileiro Série A players
Primeira Liga players
Russian Premier League players
Serie A players
North American Soccer League players
Major League Soccer players
Campeonato Brasileiro Série C players
Brazilian expatriate footballers
Expatriate footballers in Portugal
Brazilian expatriate sportspeople in Portugal
Expatriate footballers in Russia
Brazilian expatriate sportspeople in Russia
Expatriate footballers in Italy
Brazilian expatriate sportspeople in Italy
Expatriate soccer players in the United States
Brazilian expatriate sportspeople in the United States